North Curry Meadow is a 1.3 hectare (3.1 acre) biological Site of Special Scientific Interest in North Curry, Somerset, England, notified in 1989.

North Curry Meadow is a traditionally-managed hay meadow which contains a rich variety of grasses and dicotyledonous herbs characteristic of ancient, semi-natural lowland grassland. The site contains a population of the nationally scarce Corky-fruited Water-dropwort (Oenanthe pimpinelloides), indicative of a particular type of
mesotrophic grassland community which occurs locally in South West England. There is a large population of Green-winged Orchids (Orchis morio) which is favoured by the late hay cut.

References 

Sites of Special Scientific Interest in Somerset
Sites of Special Scientific Interest notified in 1989
Somerset Levels
Meadows in Somerset